Dat Adam, also known as DFA and stylized DAT ADAM, was a German hip hop-cloud rap group which was signed to BMG. Its three members are former YouTube stars Ardy (Ardian Bora), Taddl (Daniel Tjarks), and record producer Marley (Marius Ley).

Career

Formation and Chrome (2014–2015) 
Ardian Bora and Taddl Tjarks met Marius Ley through Izzi, their YouTube colleague, in 2014. That summer Tjarks and Ley produced Motus, an EP which reached number 35 on the German album chart for one week.

Bora and Tjarks then formed the rap group Dat Adam with Marius Ley. The Hydra, a symbol of the band, is tattooed on the members' fingers.

The EP Chrome, primarily produced by Ley, was released as a download on April 24, 2015. The single "Forrest" began receiving airplay a week earlier, and reached the top five on the Austrian singles chart. Chrome reached the top five on the German-language album charts, reaching number one in Austria. Dat Adam headlined the 2015 VideoDays in Berlin and Düsseldorf's 2015 Web Video Awards.

Hydra 3D and How to Flex & Troll a Scene (2016–present) 
The band performed in July 2016 at Berlin's Peace x Peace festival. The performance included two new songs, "Lennon 2" and "Ghidorah/Legobricks", from their album Hydra 3D. The other song, "Blau & Pink", was released shortly before the festival.

In October 2016, Tjarks announced on Twitter that the group was releasing their debut album and opening an online shop. The album, Hydra 3D was released on October 28 with an eponymous single. The song's music video was directed by Shawn Bu, who directed the short film Darth Maul: Apprentice. The album was released on Hydra Music, their own label.

In November 2016, Dat Adam's seven-date Space-Camp tour began in Munich and ended in Dresden. The band released their second EP, How to Flex & Troll a Scene, on March 24, 2017. Four days later, they began their Space-Camp-2017 tour. In early June, Dat Adam performed at the Rock am Ring and Rock im Park festivals. 
After the rock versions of their older songs were well-received by the festival audiences, Dat Adam announced the release of their third EP (Cyber Rock – EP) in a December 18, 2017 video. Released on December 29, it contained five rock versions of their older cyber-rap songs. Accompanying the EP was a music video, "DFA (CR-Version)".

Discography

Albums

EPs

Singles

Music videos

References

External links 
 Official website
 
 

German hip hop groups
German pop music groups